Kättemaksukontor (English: Revenge Office) is an Estonian comedy-crime television series. In the series, a group of women have the organization called "Kättemaksukontor". This organization helps to solve murder cases for the police.

The series is directed by Ain Prosa.

The series began airing in 2009, and is broadcast on TV3.

Cast
Elina Reinold – Freya Narvik (née Idasaar) (2013–)
Kadri Rämmeld – Marion Pärn (2009–)
Amanda Hermiine Künnapas – Lumi-Lee Aigo (2021–)
Ragne Veensalu – Luna Haab (2015–2021)
Adeele Sepp – Kirke Klein (2013–2015)
Tarvo Sõmer – Tiit Marvel (2011–)
Juss Haasma – Rainis Sõber (2013–2016, 2018)
Risto Vaidla – Rasmus Uuber (2016–2017)
Tanel Padar – Daniel Frank (2014–2015)
Nikolai Bentsler – Aleksandr Vesper (2010–)
Marika Vaarik – Frida Arrak (née Idasaar) (2009–2013, 2018)
Elina Purde – Häidi Õigepaulus (2009–2013, 2018)
Kristjan Sarv – Kaur Moks (2009–2013, 2018–)
Märt Avandi – Gerth Maango (2009–2011, 2013, 2017, 2018, 2021)
Ott Sepp – Kaspar Tuvi (2009–2011, 2013, 2017, 2018, 2021)
Jaan Rekkor – Rein Pihelgas (Mr. Korralik) (2010–2013)
Carmen Mikiver – Ivi Pihelgas (2011–2013)
Sepo Seeman – Martin Arrak (2009–2012, 2013)
Sergo Vares – Karl Suur (2012–2013)
Marilyn Jurman – Sonja Maango (née Säde) (2010–2011, 2017)
Ireen Kennik – Selene Kronk (2015–)
Klaudia Tiitsmaa – Kioko Veega (2017–2018)
Guido Kangur – Mart Mesilane (Mr. Hurmur) (2009–2013, 2016–)
Kristjan Lüüs – Sander Pronks (2019–)
Ivo Reinok – Margus Uniloo (FMR, Guy Fawkes) (2017–2018)

References

Estonian television series
TV3 (Estonia) original programming